Aisling Marie Cuffe (born September 12, 1993, in Cornwall, New York) is a long-distance runner from the United States. She competed in the 2012 World Junior Championships in Athletics placing 6th in 3000 meters. Cuffe ran 15:09 for the runner-up finish at 2012 Great Edinburgh International Cross Country. She competed in the 2011 IAAF World Cross Country Championships – Junior women's race placing 17th. Cuffe placed 2nd in 5000 meters at 2009 Pan American Junior Athletics Championships.

High school
Aisling Cuffe won 2009 and 2010 New York State Public High School Athletic Association Division A state Cross country titles for Cornwall Central High School. Cuffe is a seven time New York state champion. Cuffe won 2010 Foot Locker Cross Country Championships. Cuffe finished 17th at 2011 IAAF World Cross Country Championships – Junior women's race. Cuffe is a 2010-11 Gatorade cross country runner of the year in New York.

Personal life
Aisling Cuffe married Collin Leibold on September 16, 2018.

NCAA
Aisling Cuffe is a 3 time Pac-12 champion. She placed second in 5000 meters in a time of 15:37.74 at 2014 NCAA Division I Outdoor Track and Field Championships. Cuffe finished sixth at 2012 World Junior Championships in Athletics – Women's 3000 metres.

US Championships

External links 

 
 
 Aisling Cuffe All-athletics profile

References

Living people
1993 births
American female long-distance runners
American female middle-distance runners
Sportspeople from New York (state)
Track and field athletes from New York (state)
People from Cornwall, New York
People from Providence, Rhode Island
Stanford Cardinal women's track and field athletes
Stanford Cardinal women's cross country runners
21st-century American women